Paucitubulatina is a suborder of gastrotrichs in the order Chaetonotida.

Families
Chaetonotidae Gosse, 1864 sensu Leasi & Todaro, 2008
Dasydytidae von Daday, 1905
Dichaeturidae Remane, 1927
Muselliferidae Leasi & Todaro, 2008
Neogosseidae Remane, 1927
Proichthydiidae Remane, 1927
Xenotrichulidae Remane, 1927

References

External links

Gastrotricha
Protostome suborders